James "Jake" Finch (born June 16, 2005) is an American professional stock car racing driver. He competes part-time in the ARCA Menards Series East, driving the No. 1 Toyota Camry for his family owned team, Phoenix Racing, and the No. 25 Toyota Camry for Venturini Motorsports, and part-time in the ARCA Menards Series, driving the No. 55 Toyota Camry for Venturini Motorsports.

Racing career
Finch began racing go-karts at a young age. In 2020, he would drive in three late model races for Anthony Campi Racing and would win in his first start after dominating the race and leading the most laps. In his next two starts, he would finish 2nd. Phoenix Racing, the former NASCAR Cup Series team owned by Finch's father James that was sold to Turner Scott Motorsports co-owner Harry Scott Jr. in 2013, would re-open its doors and Finch would drive in several late model races with them in 2021. He entered the SRL Southwest Tour in 2022 for the same team, finishing 22nd and 23rd in his first two starts.

ARCA Menards Series East
On March 15, 2022, Phoenix Racing announced that Finch would be making his ARCA Menards Series East debut for the team in their No. 1 car at Five Flags Speedway. It would be the first time since 2013 that Phoenix Racing would compete in a NASCAR-sanctioned race. On April 26, 2022, Finch would sign with Venturini Motorsports for one race in the ARCA Menards Series East (at Dover driving the No. 25), and one race in the big ARCA Menards Series (at Pocono driving the No. 55). Finch would return to his family team and the No. 1 car for the East Series race at Nashville. He would start on the pole, lead 44 laps and finish second in the race. In both of his East Series races for Phoenix Racing, Finch drove an unbadged Toyota.

Personal life
Jake's father, James Finch, is the owner of the former NASCAR Cup Series team, Phoenix Racing. He also runs an airport construction company, Phoenix Construction. Before Jake started racing, he was an active baseball player for his local school. He currently attends A. Crawford Mosley High School and will graduate in the class of 2023.

Motorsports career results

ARCA Menards Series
(key) (Bold – Pole position awarded by qualifying time. Italics – Pole position earned by points standings or practice time. * – Most laps led.)

ARCA Menards Series East

ARCA Menards Series West 
(key) (Bold – Pole position awarded by qualifying time. Italics – Pole position earned by points standings or practice time. * – Most laps led.)

References

External links
 

2005 births
Living people
ARCA Menards Series drivers
NASCAR drivers
Racing drivers from Florida